Golden Favorites may refer to:
 Golden Favorites (Caterina Valente album)
 Golden Favorites (Ernest Tubb album), 1961 album